Kyle Uyehara (born November 27, 1989 in Whittier, California) is a U.S. short track speed skater.

Early career
Uyehara started his speed skating career in Lakewood, California then moved to Marquette, Michigan to train with the USOEC from 2006-2008.
 In 2015 Uyehara joined the U.S national short track team, training  at the Utah Olympic Oval.

Some highlights of his career include: 
2008 North American Champion 
2008 World Junior Championships team member (7th overall)
2008 American cup series junior champion
2010–11 World Cup team member
 Won a silver medal with the team at World Cup 3 in Changchun, China at the men's relay

References

External links

1989 births
Living people
American male speed skaters
Sportspeople from Whittier, California